The 2012 Novak Djokovic tennis season officially commenced on January 2 with the start of the 2012 ATP World Tour.

Yearly summary

Grand Slam performances

Australian Open

In the semi-final, Djokovic beat Andy Murray in five sets (7–5 in the 5th set) after 4 hours and 50 minutes, coming back from a two sets to one deficit and fending off break points at 5-all in the 5th set. In the final, Djokovic beat Rafael Nadal in five sets, coming from a break down in the final set to win 7–5. At 5 hours and 53 minutes, the match was the longest final in Open Era Grand Slam history, as well as the longest match in Australian Open history, surpassing the 5 hour and 14 minute 2009 semi-final between Nadal and Fernando Verdasco.

Roland Garros 

Djokovic reached his maiden French Open final by defeating Roger Federer, reaching the final of all four majors consecutively. Djokovic had the chance to become the first man since Rod Laver in 1969 to hold all four major titles at once, having won last year's Wimbledon and US Open titles as well as this year's Australian Open, but was beaten by Nadal in the final in four sets.

Wimbledon 

Djokovic failed to defend his Wimbledon title, losing to Roger Federer in four sets in the semi-finals.

US Open 

At the US Open, Djokovic reached his third consecutive final by beating fourth-seeded David Ferrer in a match suspended a day due to rain. He then lost the final to Murray in five sets.

All matches
This table chronicles all the matches of Djokovic in 2012, including walkovers (W/O) which the ATP does not count as wins. They are marked ND for non-decision or no decision.

Singles matches

Source

Doubles matches

Source

Exhibitions

Mubadala World Tennis Championship

Tournament schedule

Singles schedule

2011 source
2012 source

Doubles schedule

2011 source
2012 source

Yearly records

Statistics
The table below summarizes the worldwide ranking of Novak Djokovic in different sectors of the game according to the RICOH ATP matchfacts .

Head-to-head matchups
Novak Djokovic has a  record against the top 10, a  record against the top 50 and an  record against other players outside the top 50.

Ordered by number of wins
(Bolded number marks a top 10 player at the time of match, Italic means top 50)

 Jo-Wilfried Tsonga 5–0
 Andy Murray 4–3
 Tomáš Berdych 3–0
 David Ferrer 3–0
 Andreas Seppi 3–0
 Juan Martín del Potro 3–1
 Roger Federer 3–2
 Richard Gasquet 2–0
 Tommy Haas 2–0
 Lleyton Hewitt 2–0
 Paolo Lorenzi 2–0
 Florian Mayer 2–0
 Juan Mónaco 2–0
 Bernard Tomic 2–0
 Viktor Troicki 2–0
 Stanislas Wawrinka 2–0
 Janko Tipsarević 2–1
 Kevin Anderson 1–0
 Nicolás Almagro 1–0
 Pablo Andújar 1–0
 Marcos Baghdatis 1–0
 Julien Benneteau 1–0
 Carlos Berlocq 1–0
 Michael Berrer 1–0
 Marin Čilić 1–0
 Nikolay Davydenko 1–0
 Nicolas Devilder 1–0
 Grigor Dimitrov 1–0
 Alexandr Dolgopolov 1–0
 Rogério Dutra da Silva 1–0
 Juan Carlos Ferrero 1–0
 Fabio Fognini 1–0
 Daniel Gimeno-Traver 1–0
 Santiago Giraldo 1–0
 Andrey Golubev 1–0
 Robin Haase 1–0
 Ryan Harrison 1–0
 Blaž Kavčič 1–0
 Feliciano López 1–0
 Nicolas Mahut 1–0
 Jürgen Melzer 1–0
 Andy Roddick 1–0
 Sergiy Stakhovsky 1–0
 Potito Starace 1–0
 Cedrik-Marcel Stebe 1–0
 Radek Štěpánek 1–0
 Sam Querrey 1–1
 Rafael Nadal 1–3
 John Isner 0–1

Finals

Singles: 11 (6–5)

Earnings
Bold font denotes tournament win

Awards and nominations
 Laureus World Sports Award for Sportsman of the Year
 ATP Player of the Year
 ITF World Champion
 Best Male Tennis Player ESPY Award
 AIPS Europe Athletes of the Year
 US Open Series Champion
 Arthur Ashe Humanitarian of the Year

See also
2012 ATP World Tour
2012 Roger Federer tennis season
2012 Rafael Nadal tennis season
2012 Andy Murray tennis season

References

External links
  
 ATP tour profile

Novak Djokovic tennis seasons
Djokovic
Tennis players at the 2012 Summer Olympics
2012 in Serbian sport